This list of Georgia Institute of Technology alumni includes graduates, non-graduate former students, and current students of Georgia Tech. Notable administration, faculty, and staff are found on the list of Georgia Institute of Technology faculty. Georgia Tech alumni are generally known as Yellow Jackets. According to the Georgia Tech Alumni Association,

The first class of 128 students entered Georgia Tech in 1888, and the first two graduates, Henry L. Smith and George G. Crawford, received their degrees in 1890. Smith would later lead a manufacturing enterprise in Dalton, Georgia and Crawford would head Birmingham, Alabama's large Tennessee Coal, Iron, and Railway Company. Since then, the institute has greatly expanded, with an enrollment of 12,769 undergraduates and 6,464 postgraduate students .

Award winners

Nobel laureates

Scholars

Public figures

Business

Education

Politics and public service

Military service

Science and engineering

NASA and aerospace

Physics

Chemistry and biology

Engineering

Computer and information science

Mathematics

Humanities

Architecture and design

Arts and entertainment

Athletics

Despite their highly technical backgrounds, Tech graduates are no strangers to athletics; approximately 150 Tech students have gone into the NFL, with many others going into the NBA or MLB. Well-known American football athletes include former students Calvin Johnson, Daryl Smith, and Keith Brooking, former Tech head football coaches Pepper Rodgers and Bill Fulcher, and all-time greats such as Joe Hamilton, Pat Swilling, Billy Shaw, and Joe Guyon. Tech's recent entrants into the NBA include Javaris Crittenton, Thaddeus Young, Jarrett Jack, Luke Schenscher, Stephon Marbury, Derrick Favors, Iman Shumpert, Chris Bosh, and Travis Best. Award-winning baseball stars include Kevin Brown, Mark Teixeira, Nomar Garciaparra, Jason Varitek, Erskine Mayer, and Jay Payton. In golf, the legendary Bobby Jones founded The Masters, David Duval was ranked No. 1 in the world in 2001, Stewart Cink was the 2009 Open Championship winner, was ranked in the top ten, and Matt Kuchar won the U.S. Amateur.

Fictional people

See also

References

Georgia Institute of Technology alumni